Named meteor showers recur at approximately the same dates each year. They appear to radiate from a certain point in the sky, known as the radiant, and vary in the speed, frequency and brightness of the meteors. As of November 2019, there are 112 established meteor showers.

Table of meteor showers
Dates are given for 2022. The dates will vary from year to year due to the leap year cycle. This list includes showers with radiants in both the northern and southern hemispheres. There is some overlap, but generally showers whose radiants have positive declinations are best seen from the northern hemisphere, and those with negative declinations are best observed from the southern hemisphere.

See also 
 Lists of astronomical objects

Sources 
This list of meteor streams and peak activity times is based on data from the International Meteor Organization while most of the parent body associations are from Gary W. Kronk book, Meteor Showers: A Descriptive Catalog, Enslow Publishers, New Jersey, and from Peter Jenniskens's book, "Meteor Showers and Their Parent Comets", Cambridge University Press, Cambridge UK, .

References

Further reading
 
 
 
 

Meteor showers
Meteor showers